The 2015 National Camogie League, known for sponsorship reasons as the Irish Daily Star National Camogie League, commenced in February 2015 and was won by Galway.

References

League
National Camogie League seasons